Culama australis is a moth of the family Cossidae. It is found in most of Australia, except Tasmania.

The wingspan is 51–56 mm for males and 59–66 mm for females. Adults have grey wings, with dark lines across each forewing. At rest, they wrap their wings around their body.

The larvae bore under the bark of Eucalyptus species.

References

Cossinae
Moths described in 1856
Moths of Australia